Rose Graham may refer to:

Rose Graham (historian) (died 1963), British
Rose Graham (hotelier) (died 1974), New Zealander